This is a list of United States national Golden Gloves champions in the lightweight division, along with the state or region they represented.

1928 - Joe Kestian - Chicago, Illinois
1929 - Roosevelt Haines - Chicago, Illinois
1930 - Chancy Crain - Chicago, Illinois
1931 - Scotty Sylvano - Chicago, Illinois
1932 - Henry Rothier - Davenport, Iowa
1933 - Edward Ward - Chicago, Illinois
1934 - Frank Bojack - Cleveland, Ohio
1935 - Mike Gamiere - Cleveland, Ohio
1936 - Pete Lello - Michigan City, Indiana
1937 - Edward Kozole - Detroit, Michigan
1938 - John Benna - Terre Haute, Indiana
1939 - John Pleasant - Chicago, Illinois
1940 - Tony Ancona - Detroit, Michigan
1941 - Johnny Green - Buffalo, New York
1942 - Morris Garana - Fort Worth, Texas
1943 - Chuck Hunter - Cleveland, Ohio
1944 - Buddy Holderfield - Memphis, Tennessee
1945 - Bernard Paige - Chicago, Illinois
1946 - Herschel Acton - Oklahoma City, Oklahoma
1947 - John Labrol - Gary
1948 - Herschel Acton - Oklahoma City, Oklahoma
1949 - Gale Outhouse - Sioux City, Iowa
1950 - James Burroughs - Nashville, Tennessee
1951 - Bobby Bickle - Kansas City, Missouri
1952 - Issac Vaughn - Cleveland, Ohio
1953 - Herb Mickles - Toledo, Ohio
1954 - Phil Horsley - Muncie, Indiana
1955 - William Morton - Kansas City, Missouri
1956 - Joe Shaw - St. Louis, Missouri
1957 - Billy Braggs - Kenosha, Wisconsin
1958 - Billy Collins - Nashville
1959 - Freddie Davis - Champaign/Urbana
1960 - Brian O'Shea - Chicago, Illinois
1961 - Thomas O'Shea - Chicago, Illinois
1962 - Edward Ellis - Toledo
1963 - Perry Bennett - Streator, Illinois
1964 - Hedgeman Louis - Detroit, Michigan
1965 - Frank Anderson - Kansas City, Missouri
1966 - Marcus Anderson - Louisville, Kentucky
1967 - Quincelon Daniels - Detroit, Michigan
1968 - Ronnie Harris - Cleveland, Ohio
1969 - Eddie Murray - Chicago, Illinois
1970 - Norman Goins - Indianapolis, Indiana
1971 - James Busceme - Fort Worth, Texas
1972 - James Busceme - Fort Worth, Texas
1973 - Sugar Ray Leonard - Washington, D.C.
1974 - Curtis Harris - Elizabeth, New Jersey
1975 - Aaron Pryor - Cincinnati, Ohio
1976 - Aaron Pryor - Indianapolis, Indiana
1977 - Samuel Ayala - Fort Worth, Texas
1978 - Davey Armstrong - Puyallup, Washington
1979 - Johnny Bumphus - Knoxville, Tennessee
1980 - Melvin Paul - Lafayette, Louisiana
1981 - Primo Ramos - Chicago, Illinois
1982 - Robert Byrd - Fort Worth, Texas
1983 - Jesse Lopez, Jr. - Las Vegas
1984 - Marvin Chambers - St. Louis, Missouri
1985 - Vince Phillips - Hutchinson, Kansas
1986 - Lavell Finger - St. Louis, Missouri
1987 - Skipper Kelp - Rocky Mountain
1988 - Kevin Childrey - Grand Rapids
1989 - Tonga McLain - Milwaukee
1990-  Lamar Murphy - Florida
1991 - Desi Ford - Cleveland, Ohio
1992 - Danny Rios - Texas
1993 - Danny Rios - Mid-South
1994 - Salvador Jasso - So. California
1995 - Dante Craig - Cincinnati, Ohio
1996 - David Jackson - Nevada
1997 - Kenito Drake - Detroit
1998 - Lamont Pearson - Washington, D.C.
1999 - Matthew Smith- New Hampshire
2000 - Urbano Antillón - California 
2001 - [Matthew Smith] - New Hampshire
2002 - Lorenzo Reynolds - Michigan
2003 - Anthony Peterson - Washington, D.C.
2004 - Danny Williams - St. Louis, Missouri
2005 - Michael Evans - Cincinnati, Ohio
2006 - Jesus Mendez III - Texas
2007 - Sadam Ali - Brooklyn
2008 - Michael Perez - Newark, New Jersey
2009 - Erick Deleon - Detroit, Michigan
2010 - Erick Deleon - Detroit, Michigan
2011 - Erick Deleon - Detroit, Michigan
2012 - Albert Bell - Toledo, Ohio
2013 - Lamont Roach Jr. - Washington D.C.
2014 - Maliek Montgomery - Macon, Georgia
2015 - Teófimo López - Brooklyn
2016 - Maliek Montgomery - Macon, Georgia
2017 - Keyshawn Davis - Alexandria, Virginia
2018 - Doctress Robinson - Augusta, Georgia

References

March 27, 1941 Buffalo Courier Express Pg 19.

Golden Gloves